Dichelopa loricata is a species of moth of the family Tortricidae. It is found in Australia, where it has been recorded from New South Wales and Queensland.

The wingspan is about 10.5 mm.

References

Moths described in 1910
Dichelopa